Syringodium is a genus in the family Cymodoceaceae described as a genus in 1860. It is found along shorelines of tropical and subtropical marine environments (Indian and Pacific Oceans, Caribbean, Gulf of Mexico).

Species
There are two recognised species
Syringodium filiforme Kütz. - shores of Gulf of Mexico (TX LA MS FL, Tamaulipas, Veracruz, Tabasco, Yucatán Peninsula), and Caribbean (Bahamas, Bermuda, Cayman Islands, Greater + Lesser Antilles, Central America, Venezuela, Colombia)
Syringodium isoetifolium - Indian + western Pacific shores including Red Sea, Persian Gulf, South China Sea: Africa (Egypt to Mozambique, Madagascar, Socotra, Seychelles, Mauritius, Réunion, Maldives, Andaman & Nicobar, Arabian Peninsula, Indian Subcontinent, Southeast Asia, southern China, Papuasia, northern Australia, Papuasia, Micronesia

References

Cymodoceaceae
Alismatales genera
Taxa named by Friedrich Traugott Kützing